Chancellor chess is a chess variant invented by Benjamin R. Foster in 1887. It features all the regular chess pieces plus one  chancellor and extra pawn per side, on a 9×9 board.

See also
 Modern chess – a 9×9 variant featuring one prime minister per side

References

External links
Chancellor Chess by Hans Bodlaender, The Chess Variant Pages
Chancellor Chess (book) by Ben R. Foster, The Chess Variant Pages
Chancellor Chess a simple program by Ed Friedlander (Java)

Chess variants
1887 in chess